Larkin High School, also known as LHS, is a public four-year high school located  in Elgin, Illinois, in the United States. It is part of Elgin Area School District U46, which also includes Elgin High School, Bartlett High School, South Elgin High School, and Streamwood High School.

History
Larkin High School was built in 1962 on the former farm of Cyrus H. Larkin, after whom the school is named.  Elgin citizens were divided on the naming of the new west side high school.  Many voiced their opinion to the school board that naming it  Elgin (West) HS would better rival the original Elgin HS located on the east side of the Fox River in the City of Elgin (thus Elgin East). The Larkin name ultimately prevailed.

Academics
Larkin has not made Adequate Yearly Progress on the Prairie State Achievements Examination, a state test part of the No Child Left Behind Act. Larkin is listed as "Academic Watch Status Year 5." In 2010, the graduation rate was 78.8%.

Larkin is home to the district's Visual and Performing Arts Academy.

Student demographics
In 2017, Larkin's students were 16.3% White, 9.2% Black, 67.4% Hispanic, 2.9% Asian, 0.8% Native American, and 3.4% multiracial.

Additionally, 18.9% of students were deemed limited-English-proficient (LEP), and 74.6% of students were low income.

The 2017 attendance rate was 87.2%. Total enrollment was 2,087. Average class size was 20 students.

School Athletics 
Larkin High School is a member of the Upstate Eight Conference and has many athletic teams including:

Wrestling
Softball
Soccer
Swimming
Track&Field
Tennis
Speech
Volleyball
Basketball
Bowling
Football
Baseball
Golf
Badminton
Cross Country
Cheerleading

Activities
Larkin offers nearly forty extracurricular activities, including academic, service, and performing arts. Larkin is home of the Visual and Performing Arts Academy. The Larkin High School Visual and Performing Arts Academy (VPAA) is a four-year program which offers specialized academic studies and activities in the areas of Art, Dance, Drama, and Vocal and Instrumental Music. With being a VPAA school, Larkin also has a theater tech club that runs the lighting and sound as well as set building for the shows in the auditorium. Other activities include HOSA.

References

External links
Official Website
Wrestling Home Page
School Profile
Interactive Illinois Report Card - for test results and other school accountability information.

Public high schools in Illinois
Educational institutions established in 1962
Buildings and structures in Elgin, Illinois
Schools in Kane County, Illinois
Elgin Area School District U46